Coppinsia is a genus of lichenized fungi in the family Trapeliaceae. This is a monotypic genus, containing the single species Coppinsia minutissima.

The genus name of Coppinsia is in honour of Brian John Coppins (b.1949), British botanist (Mycology and Lichenology), who worked in the herbarium of the Royal Botanic Garden Edinburgh.

The genus was circumscribed by Helge Thorsten Lumbsch and Esther Heibel in Lichenologist Vol.30 on page 96 in 1998.

References

Baeomycetales
Baeomycetales genera
Lichen genera
Taxa described in 1998
Taxa named by Helge Thorsten Lumbsch